White River Township may refer to:

Canada
 White River, Ontario

United States

Arkansas
 White River Township, Independence County, Arkansas, in Independence County, Arkansas
 White River Township, Izard County, Arkansas, in Izard County, Arkansas
 White River Township, Madison County, Arkansas
 White River Township, Marion County, Arkansas, in Marion County, Arkansas
 White River Township, Prairie County, Arkansas, in Prairie County, Arkansas
 White River Township, Washington County, Arkansas, in Washington County, Arkansas
 White River Township, Woodruff County, Arkansas, in Woodruff County, Arkansas

Indiana
 White River Township, Gibson County, Indiana
 White River Township, Hamilton County, Indiana
 White River Township, Johnson County, Indiana
 White River Township, Randolph County, Indiana

Michigan
 White River Township, Michigan

Missouri
 White River Township, Barry County, Missouri

See also
 White Township (disambiguation)
 White Oak Township (disambiguation)
 White Rock Township (disambiguation)
 White River (disambiguation)

Township name disambiguation pages